"One in Ten" is a song by the English reggae group UB40, released in 1981 as the second single from their second album Present Arms. It reached number 7 on the UK Singles Chart.

The song title refers to the approximately 10% of the local workforce claiming unemployment benefit in the band's home region of West Midlands in the summer of 1981 when the song was recorded and released.

808 State version
In 1992, English electronic music group 808 State remixed and released "One in Ten" as a single, credited as 808 State vs. UB40. This version reached number 17 on the UK Singles Chart and number 19 on the Irish Singles Chart.

References

1981 songs
1981 singles
UB40 songs
Protest songs
1992 singles
808 State songs
UK Independent Singles Chart number-one singles